oSIP is a free software library for VoIP applications implementing lower layers of Session Initiation Protocol (SIP). The library includes the minimal codebase required by any SIP application and offers enough flexibility to implement any SIP extension or behavior. Started in September 2000 and published in April 2001, oSIP is among the oldest SIP open source stack still being developed and maintained. The project was made part of the GNU Project as GNU oSIP in 2002.

Software using oSIP 

 , the "eXtended osip" library. An extension of oSIP for softphone implementation written by Aymeric Moizard.
 GNU SIP Witch

Software that used oSIP 

 Linphone. Linphone has been the first project based on oSIP and eXosip.
 Jami (software).
 FreeSWITCH.

Usage in academic research

See also 

 List of SIP software

References 

 

 GNU oSIP Library Brave Gnu World Linux Magazine 2002 Issue 22, page 97.
 The Essential Guide to Open-Source VoIP VoIP News Mar 12, 2008
 Principios de VoIP (in Portuguese) (brief mention), Linux Magazine Brazil #3, pages 25 & 26

VoIP software
Free VoIP software
Videotelephony
Android (operating system) software
Free and open-source Android software
IOS software
BlackBerry software
Instant messaging clients
Windows instant messaging clients
Instant messaging clients for Linux
MacOS instant messaging clients
Cross-platform software
Communication software